Adapiformes is a group of early primates. Adapiforms radiated throughout much of the northern continental mass (now Europe, Asia and North America), reaching as far south as northern Africa and tropical Asia. They existed from the Eocene to the Miocene epoch.  Some adapiforms resembled living lemurs.

Adapiforms are known from the fossil record only, and it is unclear whether they form a monophyletic or paraphyletic group. When assumed to be a clade, they are usually grouped under the "wet-nosed" taxon Strepsirrhini, which would make them more closely related to the lemurs and less so to the "dry-nosed" Haplorhini taxon that includes monkeys and apes.

In 2009, Franzen and colleagues placed the newly described genus Darwinius in the  "Adapoidea group of early primates representative of early haplorhine diversification" so that, according to these authors, the adapiforms would not be within the Strepsirrhini lineage as hitherto assumed but qualify as a stem "missing link" between Strepsirrhini and Haplorrhini.  However, subsequent analysis on the Darwinius fossil by Erik Seiffert and colleagues rejects this "missing link" idea, classifying Darwinius and other adapiforms within the Strepsirrhini.

Boyer et al. found that the crown Strepsirrhini likely emerged deep in the Adapiformes tree, possibly as sister of a group which include e.g. Aframonius and Notharctidae. The Adapiformes are thus found not to be literally extinct (in the sense of having no living descendants), and becomes a junior synonym to the Strepsirrhini. Below is a simplified cladogram.

A 2018 study puts Donrussellia as sister to crown primates.

Classification 

Adapiforms belong to the infraorder Adapiformes, which contains a single superfamily, Adapoidea.  The group also is sometimes treated as a superfamily (Adapoidea) alongside the other living strepsirrhine superfamilies, Lemuroidea (lemurs) and Lorisoidea (lorises and galagos).

Infraorder Adapiformes
Superfamily Adapoidea
Family Notharctidae
Family Sivaladapidae
Family Adapidae
Infraorder incertae sedis
Superfamily incertae sedis
Family Azibiidae
Family Djebelemuridae

Rose (1995) suggests that early adapiformes and omoyiformes shared a common ancestor dating to the Thanetian age.

References

Sources

External links
Mikko's Phylogeny Archive

Prehistoric strepsirrhines
Eocene first appearances
Miocene extinctions
Mammal infraorders
Fossil taxa described in 1977
Taxa named by Robert Hoffstetter
Paraphyletic groups